Mad Mines is a fixed shooter video game written for the TRS-80 by Yves Lempereur and published by Funsoft in 1982.

Gameplay
Mad Mines is a game in which space mines float above a protective force field and the player uses a cannon to shoot them.

Reception
Dick McGrath reviewed the game for Computer Gaming World, and stated that "The originality is pretty low here, so Mad Mines [...] gets a 4 [out of 10]." In a review of six TRS-80 games for Creative Computing, Owen Linzmayer was more impressed: 
Linzmayer described Mad Mines as a combination of the Apple II games Space Eggs and Ceiling Zero.

References

External links
80-U.S. article about Funsoft
Gamer's Guide in Electronic Fun with Computers & Games

1982 video games
Fixed shooters
TRS-80 games
TRS-80-only games
Video games developed in the United States
Video games set in outer space